La Chapelle-Onzerain is a commune in the Loiret department in north-central France.

See also
Communes of the Loiret department

References

Chapelleonzerain
Loiret communes articles needing translation from French Wikipedia